Vêti (sometimes referred to as 'Vetimarché', short for vêtements (clothing)) is a French clothing shop, offering clothes for the family with over 150 retail outlets in France.
Vêti has its own brands, nine in all, as well as national brands such as Levi's, Lee Cooper and Ober at low prices.

Vêti has also signed a partnership with former Miss France, Elodie Gossuin, for the exclusive distribution of her collection "Elodie Gossuin by Vêti" for the next three years.

References

Retail companies of France
Retail companies established in 1979
Clothing companies established in 1979
French companies established in 1979